Harry's War is a 1981 American comedy-drama film from American Film Consortium and Taft International Pictures, starring Edward Herrmann, Geraldine Page, Karen Grassle, David Ogden Stiers, Elisha Cook, Salome Jens and Noble Willingham. It was written and directed by Kieth Merrill.

Plot
After his aunt dies of a heart attack while fighting the US Internal Revenue Service (IRS), Harry Johnson decides to take up the cause in what may seem to be an unconventional manner: he declares war on the IRS. After the funeral of Harry's aunt, Harry uses a Half-track to sabotage a television interview of his IRS nemesis. Several violent outcomes occur with some anti-government (or, at least, anti-IRS) rhetoric.

Cast
Edward Herrmann - Harry Johnson
Geraldine Page - 'Aunt' Beverly Payne
Karen Grassle - Kathy Johnson
David Ogden Stiers - Ernie Scelera, IRS District Director
Salome Jens - Wilda Crawley, IRS Agent
Elisha Cook, Jr. (as Elisha Cook) - Sergeant Billy Floyd
James Ray - Croft, IRS Commissioner 
Douglas Dirkson - Francis Kane (alias Draper), IRS Agent
Jim McKrell - Roger Scofield, Newsman
Noble Willingham - Major F. Andrews, United States Army
Alan Cherry - Chester Clim, IRS Agent #1
Bruce Robinson - IRS Agent #2

Production
Parts of the film were shot in St. George, Utah.

Theatrical run
This film saw a limited two-week release in theaters in March, 1981.

Television
SelecTV, ONTV, HBO and other premium cable movie channels ran the film in 1982, but it has never had a network television premiere or any other broadcast in the US since. In the UK, it was shown on Talking Pictures TV in 2021.

Home media
Image Home Video released a VHS version of the film on April 1, 1988 and using the same video transfer also did a DVD release on August 1, 2005.

Legacy
In a mid-1980s interview with David Ogden Stiers, who played the IRS director in the film, was asked what his favorite role had been and the interviewer was expecting him to say something about his character in M*A*S*H, but instead he paused for a second and said "There was this movie about the IRS and I was the biggest [bleep] in the office...."

See also
List of American films of 1981

References

External links

The New York Times Movies

1981 films
1980s political comedy-drama films
1981 independent films
American independent films
American political comedy-drama films
Films directed by Kieth Merrill
Films shot in Utah
1980s English-language films
1980s American films